This article lists the confirmed national football squads for the 2021 SAFF Championship tournament held in the Maldives, in between 1 and 16 October 2021. The position listed for each player is per the squad list in the official match reports by the SAFF. The age listed for each player is on 1 October 2021, the first day of the tournament. Players may hold more than one non-FIFA nationality. A flag is included for coaches that are of a different nationality than their own national team.

Bangladesh
Bangladesh announced their squad on 27 September 2021.

Coach:  Óscar Bruzón

India
India announced their squad on 26 September 2021.

Coach:  Igor Štimac

Maldives
Maldives announced their squad on 27 September 2021.

Coach: Ali Suzain

Nepal
Nepal announced their squad on 26 September 2021.

Coach:  Abdullah Al Mutairi

Sri Lanka
Sri Lanka announced their squad on 26 September 2021.

Coach:  Amir Alagić

References

2021 SAFF Championship
SAFF Championship squads